Juan Pablo Rodríguez Guerrero (born 7 August 1979) is a Mexican former professional footballer who played as a midfielder.

Career
Nicknamed "El Chato" or "Comandante", Rodríguez is one of the many skilled soccer players to have come out of Atlas. He was part of the Atlas' famous 98' generation alongside Rafael Márquez and others who brightened the future for Mexico national squad. His dead ball especialty skills and great vision of the field won him the right to represent his country.

Rodríguez became captain of Atlas F.C. at the age of 21. His mature performances in central midfield during the 1999 Copa Libertadores provoked much interest on the part of the League's big teams. After playing and growing as a player in Atlas for six years, he joined Tecos.

In Tecos UAG, Rodríguez's high point came in 2005, when he and Daniel Luduena led the team to the final, only to lose against Club América.

In 2006, he joined Guadalajara for the Apertura 2006 in the Mexican league, and then to Santos Laguna at Clausura 2007.

At Chivas de Guadalajara, his performance was criticized by the media, who thought Rodríguez could only perform well without pressure, which led to transfer rumors, realized when he joined Santos, with bad reviews following him during the first part of the season, with his new team struggling to remain in Primera División. However, in 2007 Clausura he displayed good enough football to earn a starting place.

At the start of the Apertura 2007, in the second game, Rodríguez scored against Toluca, eventually beating them 3–2. He also scored in the match against Club Puebla

An international since 2003, Rodríguez has 36 caps for Mexico, with 2 goals. He was part of 2003 CONCACAF Gold Cup where Mexico won. He was also present in the 2005 FIFA Confederations Cup, with the national side finishing fourth, losing on |extra time]] against Germany.
In December 2014 he returned to his first team, Atlas F.C.

International goals

|-
| 1. || July 20, 2003 || Estadio Azteca, Mexico City, Mexico ||  || 5–0 || 5–0 || 2003 CONCACAF Gold Cup
|}

Honours 
Guadalajara
Mexican Primera División: Apertura 2006

Santos Laguna
Mexican Primera División: Clausura 2008, Clausura 2012
Copa MX: Apertura 2014

Individual
Best Midfielder of the tournament: Invierno 1999
Best Defensive Midfielder of the tournament: Apertura 2011
Best Defensive Midfielder of the tournament: Clausura 2012

References

External links
 
 
 
 

1979 births
Living people
Footballers from Jalisco
Mexico international footballers
CONCACAF Gold Cup-winning players
2001 Copa América players
2001 FIFA Confederations Cup players
2003 CONCACAF Gold Cup players
2005 FIFA Confederations Cup players
People from Zapopan, Jalisco
Atlas F.C. footballers
C.D. Guadalajara footballers
Santos Laguna footballers
Tecos F.C. footballers
Atlético Morelia players
Liga MX players
Mexico under-20 international footballers
Association football midfielders
Mexican footballers